John Jackson (November 1848 – June 4, 1910) was an American politician who served in the Virginia House of Delegates.

References

External links 

1848 births
1910 deaths
Democratic Party members of the Virginia House of Delegates
19th-century American politicians